Khalli Balak Min ZouZou is a 1972 Egyptian movie directed by Hassan El-Imam starring Soad Hosny, Hussein Fahmy and Taheyya Kariokka. As with many Egyptians movies of the era, it combines drama, comedy, and music. With its musical numbers and dance sequences, it has become one of Hosny's best loved films and a household favourite in Egypt. However, through these dance sequences, it holds a mirror up to Egyptian society in the 1970s. The movie focuses on the tensions within Egyptian society between tradition and modernism, as well as social pressure towards liberalism. Watch Out for ZouZou was listed in the top 100 Egyptian films list.

Plot 
ZouZou is a college student that comes from a family of entertainers. Her mother was a retired belly dancer and runs a troupe of performers that entertain at weddings. Her home was on Cairo's famous Muhammad Ali St., known for housing entertainers and musicians. Zouzou performs every night with her family at weddings and private parties as a dancer and singer. This is kept as a secret from all her friends because she worries about how she will be perceived by her peers. Being a professional belly dancer in Egypt during this period was understood to be a low profession, one loosely associated with prostitution, or a lack of morality.  Zouzou falls in love with one of her professors who breaks his engagement in order to be with her. The cousin of the professor tries to break off what he has with Zouzou and eventually finds out that she is an entertainer. The cousin frames Zouzou in public, arranging an event that forces her to expose her work as a dancer. Her professor was shocked and ashamed at first, but in the end, all is resolved as Zouzou decides to return to her studies and embrace a bright future free of the need to work as a Muhammad Ali St. dancer.

Cast 
Soad Hosni as Zouzou Almazia
Taheyya Kariokka as Naima Almazia
Hussein Fahmy as professor Said Kamel
Azza Sherif 
Samir Ghanem
Shahinaz Taha
Mohie Ismail
Abbas Fares
Zouzou Shakib
Ali Gohar
Mostafa Metwali

Music  
Khalli Balak Min ZouZou has many songs that are still sung by Egyptians till now. The songs were the most influential and memorable on Egyptians and many more. Two main music composers were Kamal El-Taweel and Salah Jahin. Kamal El-Taweel was friends with Abdel Halim Hafez, also another great music composer and singer. Kamal El-Taweel created the most memorable song Ya Wad Ya Te’eel (O Teaser Boy) which was sung by Soad Hosny.

References 

Azza Sharif (عزة شريف) and Souad Hosni (1972) 
http://www.elcinema.com/person/pr1083752/
http://www.elcinema.com/person/pr1028411/
Walter Armbrust. Mass Culture and Modernism in Egypt. Cambridge: Cambridge University Press, 1996, pp 117–125.

External links 

1972 romantic comedy films
1972 films
Egyptian romantic comedy films
1970s Arabic-language films